Kirill Maksimov (born June 1, 1999) is a Russian-Canadian professional ice hockey winger who is currently an unrestricted free agent. He was drafted by the Edmonton Oilers in the 2017 NHL Entry Draft and played in the Ontario Hockey League for the Saginaw Spirit and Niagara IceDogs.

Career statistics

Regular season and playoffs

International

References

External links

1999 births
Living people
Bakersfield Condors players
HC CSKA Moscow players
Edmonton Oilers draft picks
Niagara IceDogs players
Russian ice hockey left wingers
Saginaw Spirit players